Mrktich Hovhannisyan (born 4 January 1970) is a retired Armenian football midfielder.

References

1970 births
Living people
Armenian footballers
FC Kotayk Abovyan players
Erebuni-Homenmen FC players
Zvartnots-AAL FC players
FC Lernagorts Kapan players
FC Urartu players
Association football midfielders
Armenia international footballers